Wagner is a city in Charles Mix County, South Dakota, United States. The population was 1,490 at the 2020 census. The city is served by Wagner Municipal Airport as well as YST Transit buses.

History
Wagner was founded in 1900. The town was incorporated in 1907, and was named for Walt Wagner, local postmaster.

Geography
Wagner is located at  (43.080349, -98.294799).

Demographics

2010 census
At the 2010 census, there were 1,566 people, 639 households and 367 families living in the city. The racial makeup of the city was 54.7% White, 0.2% African American, 40.5% Native American, 0.2% Asian, 0.8% from other races, and 3.6% from two or more races. Hispanic or Latino of any race were 3.0% of the population.

There were 639 households, of which 29.6% had children under the age of 18 living with them, 38.2% were married couples living together, 13.6% had a female householder with no husband present, 5.6% had a male householder with no wife present, and 42.6% were non-families. 39.9% of all households were made up of individuals, and 21.1% had someone living alone who was 65 years of age or older. The average household size was 2.36 and the average family size was 3.20.

The median age was 42.8 years. 27.2% of residents were under the age of 18; 6.8% were between the ages of 18 and 24; 18.5% were from 25 to 44; 23.3% were from 45 to 64; and 24.1% were 65 years of age or older. The gender makeup of the city was 47.7% male and 52.3% female.

2000 census
At the 2000 census, there were 1,675 people, 678 households and 406 families living in the city. The population density was 619.4 per square mile (239.5/km2). There were 747 housing units at an average density of 276.2 per square mile (106.8/km2). The racial makeup of the city was 63.40% White, 0.24% African American, 34.33% Native American, 0.06% Asian, 0.48% from other races, and 1.49% from two or more races. Hispanic or Latino of any race were 2.99% of the population.

There were 678 households, of which 28.0% had children under the age of 18 living with them, 40.4% were married couples living together, 14.6% had a female householder with no husband present, and 40.0% were non-families. 37.0% of all households were made up of individuals, and 21.5% had someone living alone who was 65 years of age or older. The average household size was 2.37 and the average family size was 3.11.

28.5% of the population were under the age of 18, 5.4% from 18 to 24, 22.9% from 25 to 44, 19.5% from 45 to 64, and 23.7% who were 65 years of age or older. The median age was 40 years. For every 100 females, there were 80.7 males. For every 100 females age 18 and over, there were 74.6 males.

The median household income was $21,863 and the median family income was $28,021. Males had a median income of $26,216 and females $17,333. The per capita income was $12,207. About 20.5% of families and 25.1% of the population were below the poverty line, including 30.6% of those under age 18 and 28.6% of those age 65 or over.

Climate
This climatic region is typified by large seasonal temperature differences, with warm to hot (and often humid) summers and cold (sometimes severely cold) winters.  According to the Köppen Climate Classification system, Wagner has a humid continental climate, abbreviated "Dfa" on climate maps.

See also
 List of cities in South Dakota

References

External links

 

Cities in Charles Mix County, South Dakota
Cities in South Dakota